Musket (1867–1885) was an English-bred Thoroughbred racehorse and a Leading sire in Australia and New Zealand.

Breeding
He was sired by Toxophilite, his dam was a bay mare (1857) who was a half-sister to General Peel’s dam, by West Australian (winner of the 1853 British Triple Crown) from Brown Bess (1844) by Camel. Musket was inbred to Touchstone in the fourth generation (4x4).

Racing record
In England Musket won nine races including the Ascot Stakes before retiring to stud there where he only had limited patronage. In spite of this he managed to sire Petronel winner of the 2,000 Guineas and Brown Bess (1876) winner of the Doncaster Cup and Goodwood Stakes.

Stud record
In December 1878 Musket was imported into Victoria by the Auckland Stud Company and then sent to Auckland, New Zealand the following month. Initially he was used here to cover “half-bred” mares to breed coach horses.

He sired 28 stakeswinners which had 107 stakes wins, including:
 Cuirassier, won Great Northern Derby
 Foul Shot, won Auckland Derby
 Fusilade, won New Zealand Cup
 Fusilier, won Wanganui Derby
 Manton, Derby Stakes, New Zealand Cup, Wanganui Derby
 Martini-Henry, Victoria Derby, Melbourne Cup
 Nordenfeldt, Victoria Derby, AJC Australian Derby
 Trenton, ARC Welcome Stakes, CJC Champagne Stakes, VRC Royal Park Stakes (twice), etc., sire of good racehorses including Wakeful and Auraria.

Musket is best remembered for siring the famous Carbine (great-great-grandsire of Nearco), Nordenfeldt, Trenton (a leading sire in Australasia and then exported), Martini-Henry  and Hotchkiss, all top sires. The bloodlines of Musket including Carbine and Trenton, are still evident in many horses racing today.

Musket had his portrait painted by the noted equine artist, Martin Stainforth and it was reproduced in Racehorses in Australia.

Pedigree

References

1867 racehorse births
1885 racehorse deaths
Racehorses bred in the United Kingdom
Racehorses trained in the United Kingdom
Champion Thoroughbred Sires of Australia
Thoroughbred family 3-d